Mons Peak is located on the border of Alberta and British Columbia. It was named in 1920 after the town of Mons in Belgium.

See also
 List of peaks on the Alberta–British Columbia border
 Mountains of Alberta
 Mountains of British Columbia

References

Mons Peak
Mons Peak
Canadian Rockies